Alla Solomonova (Malchyk) is a Paralympian athlete from Ukraine competing mainly in category F35/F36 shot put events.

Biography
She competed in the 2004 Summer Paralympics in Athens, Greece. There she won a bronze medal in the women's shot put F35/F36 event.  She also set a world record in the F36 discus throw while finishing fifth in the F35/F36/F38 discus throw.

Four years later she competed in the 2008 Summer Paralympics in Beijing, China. There she improved to gold medal in the women's shot put F35/F36 event and bronze in the women's discus throw F35/F36.

External links
 

Paralympic athletes of Ukraine
Athletes (track and field) at the 2008 Summer Paralympics
Paralympic gold medalists for Ukraine
Paralympic bronze medalists for Ukraine
Living people
Medalists at the 2004 Summer Paralympics
Medalists at the 2008 Summer Paralympics
Ukrainian female shot putters
Ukrainian female discus throwers
Year of birth missing (living people)
Paralympic medalists in athletics (track and field)